Calder is a rural locality in the local government area of Waratah-Wynyard in the North West region of Tasmania.
The 2016 census determined a population of 212 for the state suburb of Calder.

History
The locality was named for James Erskine Calder, the Surveyor General of Tasmania between 1859 and 1870. It was gazetted as a locality in 1966.

Geography
The Inglis River forms most of the western boundary. The Calder River enters the locality in the south-east and flows north-west until it meets the Inglis River.

Road infrastructure
The C235 route (Calder Road) enters from the north-east and runs south to the centre before exiting to the east as Kellatier Road.

References

Localities of Waratah–Wynyard Council
Towns in Tasmania